Keno J. Hills (born June 13, 1973 in Tampa, Florida) is a former American football offensive lineman in the NFL for the New Orleans Saints. He was selected in the sixth round of the 1996 NFL Draft from the University of Louisiana at Lafayette.

In late December 1998 Hills was charged with drugs and weapons violations. Then 25, he was booked with possession of heroin with the intent to distribute and possession of a firearm during a drug transaction. The charges were later dropped.

Hills did not see any field action with the Saints in 1999 — inactive for seven contests. He signed with the Chicago Bears on December 30, 1999 and was inactive for his only game on Chicago’s 53-man roster. He was released by the Bears on June 16, 2000.

The Miami Dolphins signed Hills June 21, 2000 as a free agent offensive tackle with a one-year contract. He went to the Dolphins' training camp but was released in the first cut.

External links
 Player Profile at  nfl.com

1973 births
Living people
Players of American football from Tampa, Florida
African-American players of American football
American football offensive tackles
American football offensive guards
Kent State Golden Flashes football players
Louisiana Ragin' Cajuns football players
New Orleans Saints players
Chicago Bears players
21st-century African-American sportspeople
20th-century African-American sportspeople